Ambala Jattan (Village ID 30864) is a village in Punjab, India, located in the district Hoshiarpur, near Garhdiwala. Ambala Jattan is located 28.9 km away from the main city Hoshiarpur and 150 km from Chandigarh. According to the 2011 census it has a population of 1125 living in 246 households. Its main agriculture product is wheat growing.

References

Villages in Hoshiarpur district